Abismo Ouro Grosso (English: Thick Gold) (SP-054), also Gruta Ouro Grosso, is a  shaft consisting of waterfalls and natural pools. It was created by the capture of surface rivers by carbonate rocks with subterranean drainage systems in an advanced stage of evolution. First explored by the German naturalist and spelunker Michel Le Bret in the 1970s, it is located at the Nucleo Ouro Grosso, within the borders of the Alto Ribeira Tourist State Park, in the municipality of Iporanga,  from Sao Paulo, Brazil.

See also
List of caves in Brazil

References

External links
 Base de Dados do Ministerio do Meio Hambiente Governo Federal - ICMBIO Official Website

Caves of São Paulo (state)
Wild caves